Tioga Peak is located in Mono County, California, approximately two miles outside of Yosemite National Park. It is situated in the Hoover Wilderness on land managed by Inyo National Forest.

The location of Tioga Peak

Tioga Peak is three miles north-northeast of Tioga Pass, at the head of Lee Vining Canyon. Highway 120 traverses its south and east slopes. The summit is like a rolling dome. It has some of the best views of the Tioga Pass region.

Both Mount Dana and Tioga Pass are visible from the summit.

Tioga Peak is a rounded peak, made of metamorphic rock.

Climate
Tioga Peak is located in an alpine climate zone. Most weather fronts originate in the Pacific Ocean, and travel east toward the Sierra Nevada mountains. As fronts approach, they are forced upward by the peaks (orographic lift), causing moisture in the form of rain or snowfall to drop onto the range. Precipitation runoff from this mountain drains to Lee Vining Creek and ultimately Mono Lake.

Gallery

See also
 
 Geology of the Yosemite area

References

External links and references

 alltrails.com on Tioga Peak
 On hiking Tioga Peak; has a topographic map of the area

 Mountains of Mono County, California
North American 3000 m summits
Mountains of Northern California
Sierra Nevada (United States)
Inyo National Forest